Brendan William John Creed (born 3 January 1993) is an English field hockey player who plays as a defender for Belgian club Beerschot and the  England and Great Britain national teams.

Club career
Creed will play club hockey for Belgian club Beerschot in the 2021–22 season.

He has been playing in the Men's England Hockey League for Surbiton.

Prior to that, he played in Germany for Men's Feldhockey Bundesliga club Harvestehude.
He has also played for Sheffield Hallam and Bowdon.

References

External links

1993 births
Living people
Sportspeople from Solihull
English male field hockey players
Male field hockey defenders
Expatriate field hockey players
English expatriate sportspeople in Germany
Commonwealth Games medallists in field hockey
Commonwealth Games bronze medallists for England
Surbiton Hockey Club players
Harvestehuder THC players
Men's England Hockey League players
Field hockey players at the 2018 Commonwealth Games
Field hockey players at the 2020 Summer Olympics
Olympic field hockey players of Great Britain
Men's Feldhockey Bundesliga players
Men's Belgian Hockey League players
Royal Beerschot THC players
Medallists at the 2018 Commonwealth Games